Baldev Singh Tomar (born 10 December 1970 in Shillai, Sirmour district) is an Indian politician and member of the Bharatiya Janata Party. Tomar is a former member of the Himachal Pradesh Legislative Assembly from the Shillai constituency in Sirmaur district.

References 

People from Sirmaur district
Bharatiya Janata Party politicians from Himachal Pradesh
Himachal Pradesh MLAs 2012–2017
Living people
21st-century Indian politicians
1970 births
Indian football executives